Muharrem Fejzo (24 May 1933 – 22 November 2020) was an Albanian film director.

He died from COVID-19 on 22 November 2020, at the age of 87.

Filmography
Montatorja (1970)
Kapedani (1972)
Operacioni "zjarri" (1973)
Shpërthimi (1974)
Fije që priten (1976)
Gunat përmbi tela (1977)
Pranverë në Gijirokastër (1978)
Mësonjëtorja (1979)
Mëngjese të reja (1980)
Thesari (1981)
Një emër midis njerëzve (1983)
Pranverë e hidhur (1985)
Binarët (1987)
Muri i gjallë (1989)

References

1933 births
2020 deaths
Deaths from the COVID-19 pandemic in Albania
Albanian film directors
People from Kolonjë